Other ranks is a formal term describing the military personnel of some countries who are not commissioned officers, specifically:

Other ranks (Denmark)
Other ranks (UK)

See also
 Enlisted rank, the equivalent term in the United States and many non-Commonwealth nations
 Non-commissioned member, the equivalent term in the Canadian armed forces
 Naval rating, the corresponding term used in the Royal Navy of the United Kingdom